The New Haven Formation is a geologic formation in Connecticut. It preserves fossils dating back to the Triassic period.

See also

 List of fossiliferous stratigraphic units in Connecticut

References
 

Triassic Connecticut